"Drag City" is a 1963 song by Jan and Dean, written by Jan Berry, Roger Christian, and Brian Wilson. It describes the narrator's trip to a drag racing strip and borrows heavily from an earlier Jan and Dean song "Surf City," also co-written by Berry and Wilson.

"Drag City" was released as the title track from the album of the same name. It was the first of the duo's seven hit songs in 1964, and charted in the top ten in January.

Personnel
The musicians on the session included: 
 Earl Palmer, drums

Chart performance

References

1963 singles
Jan and Dean songs
Songs about cars
Songs written by Brian Wilson
Songs written by Roger Christian (songwriter)
1963 songs
Songs written by Jan Berry
Liberty Records singles